This is the list of United Kingdom MPs by seniority, 2019–present. The Members of Parliament (MPs), who were elected in the 2019 general election and during the 58th Parliament, are ranked by the beginning of their terms in office in the House of Commons.

Criteria
The seniority criteria used in this article are derived from how the Father of the House is selected. They are not laid down in Standing Orders but arise from the customary practice of the House of Commons. The modern custom is that the Father of the House is the MP who has the longest continuous service. If two or more members were first elected in the same General Election (or at by-elections held on the same day), then priority is given to the one who was sworn in first. The order of swearing in is recorded in the House of Commons Journal, the official record of proceedings.

When a member has had broken service, that does not affect his or her seniority (for the purpose of qualifying as the Father of the House) which is based on the latest period of continuous service.

The Sinn Féin members, who abstain from taking their seats at Westminster, have never been sworn in. They are ranked (in this list) after all other members who have taken their seats. Between themselves, they are ranked by the first date of the election, for the current period of continuous service. If they are equal on that criterion, then they are ranked in alphabetical order by surname.

Summary of members elected by party

List
This article assigns a numerical rank to each of the 650 members elected in the 2019 general election. Other members, who were not the first person declared elected to a seat but who joined the House during the Parliament, are not assigned a number.
Members named in italics are no longer sitting.

See also
List of MPs elected in the 2019 United Kingdom general election
List of United Kingdom by-elections (2010–present)

Notes

References

External links
 Father of the House: House of Commons background paper Retrieved 19 May 2015 
 Members 1979–2010 Retrieved 16 March 2015
 House of Commons member data Retrieved 28 April 2020

2019 United Kingdom general election
2019
Seniority